George I, Prince of Waldeck and Pyrmont (6 May 17479 September 1813) was Prince of Waldeck and Pyrmont from 1812 to 1813.

He was the son of Karl August, Prince of Waldeck and Pyrmont and Countess Palatine Christiane Henriette of Zweibrücken-Birkenfeld.

Prince of Waldeck and Pyrmont

The principality was divided 1805, Pyrmont was given to George, and his brother Friedrich Karl August stayed with Waldeck. In 1807, Waldeck joined the Confederation of the Rhine.

After the death of his brother in 1812, George took over the government in Waldeck.

Marriage and children
He married Princess Augusta of Schwarzburg-Sondershausen (1768-1849), daughter of August II, Prince of Schwarzburg-Sondershausen and Princess Christine of Anhalt-Bernburg, in Otterwisch on 12 September 1784. They had nine sons and four daughters:

Princess Christiane of Waldeck and Pyrmont (23 March 1787 – 16 March 1806)
Prince Karl of Waldeck and Pyrmont (7 July 1788  – 3 October 1795)
George II (20 September 1789 – 15 May 1845), married Princess Emma of Anhalt-Bernburg-Schaumburg-Hoym, had issue
Prince Friedrich of Waldeck and Pyrmont (3 November 1790 – 1 February 1828), married Ursula Polle, created Countess of Waldeck, had issue who held the title Count/Countess von Waldeck.
Prince Christian of Waldeck and Pyrmont (19 June 1792 – 8 July 1795)
Princess Augusta of Waldeck and Pyrmont (7 August 1793 – 29 April 1794)
Prince Johann of Waldeck and Pyrmont (25 September 1794 – 8 October 1814)
Princess Ida of Waldeck and Pyrmont (26 September 1796 – 12 April 1869), married George William, Prince of Schaumburg-Lippe, had issue.
Prince Wolrad of Waldeck and Pyrmont (23 April 1798 – 24 August 1821)
Princess Mathilde of Waldeck and Pyrmont (10 Apr 1801 – 13 Apr 1825), married Duke Eugen of Württemberg, had issue.
Prince Karl Christian of Waldeck and Pyrmont (12 April 1803   – 19 Jul 1846), married Countess Amalie of Lippe-Biesterfeld, had issue.
Princess Karoline Christiane of Waldeck and Pyrmont (17 November 1804  – 3 March 1806)
Prince Hermann of Waldeck and Pyrmont (12 October 1809  – 6 October 1876), married Countess Agnes Teleki de Szék, no issue.

Ancestry

Notes and sources

thePeerage.com - Georg I Prinz zu Waldeck und Pyrmont
http://www.documentarchiv.de/nzjh/1807/rheinbund_akzessionsvertrag-waldeck.html (German)
Karl Theodor Menke: Pyrmont und seine Umgebung. Hameln, Pyrmont, 1840, S.65
L. Curtze: Geschichte und Beschreibung des Fürstentums Waldeck. Arolsen, 1850, S.619f.

1747 births
1813 deaths
People from Bad Arolsen
People from the Principality of Waldeck and Pyrmont
Princes of Waldeck and Pyrmont
House of Waldeck and Pyrmont